Emiliano Piedra Miana (1931–August 28, 1991) was a Spanish film producer.

He was married from 1967 until his death to actress Emma Penella. He produced Orson Welles' Chimes at Midnight  and Carlos Saura's flamenco trilogy film: Bodas de sangre, Carmen and El amor brujo.

References

External links

 
 

Spanish film producers
1931 births
1991 deaths
Honorary Goya Award winners
Filmmakers who won the Best Foreign Language Film BAFTA Award